Martin Taylor (born 10 April 1957) was an English cricketer. He was a left-handed batsman and a left-arm medium-pace bowler who played for Devon. He was born in Liverpool.

Taylor, who played for Devon in the Minor Counties Championship between 1981 and 1987, made two appearances for the team in the NatWest Trophy, the first in 1984, and the second in 1987. He scored 12 runs in the first match in which he played, and 5 runs in the second.

External links
Martin Taylor at CricketArchive 

1957 births
Living people
English cricketers
Devon cricketers